Didon is the title of two French operas:

Didon (Desmarets), a 1693 opera by Henri Desmarets
Didon (Piccinni), a 1783 opera by Niccolò Piccinni

See also 

 Dido (disambiguation)
 Didone (disambiguation)